Leonid Osipovich Utesov, also spelled Utyosov or Utiosov, born Lazar (Leyzer) Iosifovich Vaysbeyn or Weissbein (Odesa – 9 March 1982, Moscow), was a famous Soviet estrada singer, and comic actor, who became the first pop singer to be awarded the prestigious title of People's Artist of the USSR in 1965.

Biography
Leonid Utesov was brought up in Odesa, Russian Empire and attended the Faig School of Commerce, from which he dropped out and joined the Borodanov Circus troupe as an acrobat. He started his stage career in 1911 in Kremenchuk, then returned to Odesa, changed his artistic name to Leonid Utesov, and performed as a stand up comedian with the Rosanov troupe and with the Rishelyavsky Theatre. In 1917, he won a singing competition in Gomel, Belarus, then performed in Moscow.

In the 1920s, he moved to Leningrad and set up one of the first Soviet jazz bands. In Leningrad, he began collaboration with the popular composer, Isaak Dunayevsky, which turned out to be a breakthrough for both artists. At that time, Utesov built a band of the finest musicians available in Leningrad, and created a style all his own – a jazz show with stand up comedy, which blended several styles, ranging from Russian folk songs to a variety of international cosmopolitan genres. In 1928, Utesov toured Europe and attended performances of American jazz bands in Paris, which influenced his own style. During the 1930s, Utesov and his band, called "Thea-Jazz" (a portmanteau of Theatrical Jazz) had a regular gig at the Marble Hall of the Kirov Palace of Culture in Leningrad. Utesov's jazz band also performed at the Leningrad Maly Opera theatre, at the "Svoboda-teatr," and at the Leningrad Music Hall. In his performances, Utesov delivered a variety of musical styles, including such genres as American jazz, Argentine tango, French chanson, upbeat dance, and Russian folk music.

His popularity was on the rise in the 1930s when he co-starred with Lyubov Orlova in the comedy Jolly Fellows. In it, Utesov performed such hits as "Serdtse" (Heart). During World War II, Utesov performed on the front lines, helping lift the spirits of the Soviet soldiers fighting against the Nazis. On Victory Day (9 May 1945), he performed on Sverdlov Square in Moscow.

Utesov lived in Moscow for the rest of his life, albeit in many of his songs he alluded to his native town of Odesa, where a monument to him was dedicated in 2000.

Richard Stites writes:In the years of the "red jazz age" (1932–1936) European and Soviet bands were heard in dozens of cities. The kings were Alexander Tsfasman and Leonid Utesov. ... Utesov – musically far less gifted – was actually more popular than Tsfasman, partly because of the spectacular success of his comedy film Happy-Go-Lucky Guys, but mostly because his Odesa background and his circus and carnival road experience on the southern borscht belt gave him a clowning manner. He resembled his idol, the personable Ted ("Is everybody happy?") Lewis more than he did any of the great jazz figures of the time. In fact, Utesov was the typical estrada entertainer – quick witted, versatile, and funny. He was not only one of the stars of the 1930s but also a personal favorite of Stalin.

Filmography
 1919 – Lieutenant Schmidt – Freedom Fighter (Russian: Лейтенант Шмидт — борец за свободу)
 1923 – Trade-House "Entente and Co." (Russian: Tорговый дом «Антанта и К»)
 1926 – Career of Spirka Shpandyr
 1928 – Strangers (Russian: Чужие)
 1934 – Jolly Fellows (Russian: Весёлые ребята) — Kostya Potekhin
 1940 – Concert on the Screen (Russian: Концерт на экране)
 1942 – Concert for the Frontlines (Russian: Концерт фронту)
 1954 – Merry Stars (Russian: Весёлые звёзды)
 1963 – Melodies of Dunayevsky (Russian: Мелодии Дунаевского)
 1974 – Pyotr Martynovich and the Years of a Great Life (Russian: Пётр Мартынович и годы большой жизни)

Singles
 Gop so smykom
 S Odesskogo kichmana
 Odessit-Mishka
 Havana
 Have a good night
 Road to Berlin
 My dear Muscovites
 Waves of the Danube
 Jewish Rhapsody
 On a wing and a prayer
 When Johnny came home
 Leningrad bridges
 Happy-go-lucky guys marsh
 Song of the old cab
 Beautiful marquise
 Sea widely
 Suliko
 Tachanka
 Chapliniana
 In the Black Sea
 Tyuh-tyuh
 Oh, my Odesa
 Moscow Windows

Honours and awards

A minor planet, 5944 Utesov, discovered on 2 May 1984, is named after him. On March 21, 2020, Google celebrated his 125th birthday with a Google Doodle.

See also
Pyotr Leshchenko
Mark Bernes
Klavdiya Shulzhenko
List of Jewish musicians
Mishka Yaponchik

Notes

References

External links

Biography
Biography (in Russian)
in Russian, see items 277–287 for Utesov's songs

1895 births
1982 deaths
20th-century comedians
20th-century Russian male actors
20th-century Russian singers
Entertainers from Odesa
Film people from Odesa
Musicians from Odesa
Honored Artists of the RSFSR
People's Artists of the RSFSR
People's Artists of the USSR
Recipients of the Order of the Red Banner of Labour
Russian male comedians
Russian pop singers
Soviet male actors
Soviet jazz musicians
Jewish Russian comedians
Male jazz musicians
Odesa Jews
Jewish Russian actors
20th-century Russian male singers